Sphenomorphus taiwanensis  is a species of skink. It is endemic to Taiwan and is common in areas above  asl.

References

taiwanensis
Reptiles of Taiwan
Endemic fauna of Taiwan
Reptiles described in 1987
Taxa named by Kuang-yang Lue